The Killing of Kenneth Chamberlain is a 2019 American thriller drama film written, produced and directed by David Midell and starring Frankie Faison as the real life titular character. It is based on the police shooting of Chamberlain that occurred on November 29, 2011, in White Plains, New York. Morgan Freeman and Lori McCreary serve as executive producers of the film.

Cast
Frankie Faison as Kenneth Chamberlain Sr.
Steve O'Connell as Sergeant Walter Parks
Enrico Natale as Officer Michael Rossi
Ben Marten as Officer Patrick Jackson
Angela Peel as Tonyia Greenhill
Tom McElroy as Sergeant Flannigan
LaRoyce Hawkins as Kenneth Chamberlain Jr.
Christopher R. Ellis as Officer Talbot
Anika Noni Rose as Candace Wade
Antonio Polk as Officer Evans
Dexter Zollicoffer as Roland Green
Kelly Owens as Mitzi Pratt
Armando Reyes as Armando Ruiz
Eunice Woods as Karen Chamberlain
Daniel Houle as Lieutenant Hughes
Linda Bright Clay as Carol Matthews
Kate Black-Spence as Dispatcher
Alexander Strong as Ava Chamberlain
Nayeli Pagaza as 911 Operator

Kristine Angela, Joey Ascaridis, Moira Begale, Nick Cardiff & Jared Winkler also play additional roles.

Release
The film made its world premiere at the Austin Film Festival in October 2019.

Accolades
The film won the Best Narrative Feature Award at the 24th Urbanworld Film Festival.

References

External links
 
 

2019 films
2019 drama films
2019 thriller films
2019 thriller drama films
American thriller drama films
American films based on actual events
Films set in the 21st century
2010s English-language films
2010s American films